Shark River Park is located in the townships of Neptune, Wall and Tinton Falls in coastal New Jersey and is part of the Monmouth County Park System.

The park is bisected by the Shark River from which the park gets its name and is the source of fossils for local elementary school field trips where students search the river gravel for prehistoric shark's teeth.

Activities and facilities
The park's developed recreational offerings include fishing (with permit), picnic areas, playgrounds and a shelter building.

The park has three entrance/parking areas, Main/Schoolhouse Road entrance, Gully Road entrance and Hillside parking area

Trails

The park hosts seven trails of varying difficulty:
 Bridge loop .4 mile
 Cedar loop 1.2 mile
 Fitness trail
 Hidden Creek 2 mile
 Pine Hills 1.4 mile
 Shark River run 2.4 mile
 Rivers Edge 1 mile

References

External links
Shark River Park, Monmouth County Park System

County parks in New Jersey
Parks in Monmouth County, New Jersey
Neptune Township, New Jersey
Tinton Falls, New Jersey
Wall Township, New Jersey